Sainte-Marguerite River may refer to:

 Sainte-Marguerite River (Saguenay), a tributary of the Saguenay River
 Sainte-Marguerite River (Sept-Îles), a tributary of the Saint Lawrence, damned by the Denis-Perron dam